PARC Management, LLC is an operations company based in Jacksonville, Florida, U.S. which operates a Go-Cart Family Entertainment Center, in Sevierville, Tennessee.

Purchased parks

Former 10 Family Entertainment Centers around the US and Canada:

 Camelot Park Bakersfield, California
 Fiddlesticks Tempe, Arizona
 Funtasticks Tucson, Arizona
 Mountasia North Richland Hills, Texas
 NASCAR SpeedPark Vaughan, Ontario
 NASCAR SpeedPark Hazelwood, Missouri
 NASCAR SpeedPark Concord, North Carolina
 NASCAR SpeedPark Myrtle Beach, South Carolina
 Zuma Fun Center Charlotte, North Carolina
 Zuma Fun Center Knoxville, Tennessee
 Zuma Fun Center North Houston, Texas
 Zuma Fun Center South Houston, Texas

References

External links
PARC Management, LLC website

 
Amusement park companies